Coleophora infolliculella is a moth of the family Coleophoridae. It is found in Algeria, Tunisia, and Spain.

The larvae feed on the fruits and bast of Hammada articulata.

References

infolliculella
Moths described in 1915
Moths of Africa
Moths of Europe